Generasi Biru is Slank's fourth album. It was released on November 15, 1994. This is the first album produced by Slank after the contract with Boedi Soesatio was discontinued. The first three albums were produced by Boedi Soesatio under the Proyek 'Q' label. It was recorded in 1994 in Cipayung and Cibubur, West Java.

Production

Background
Slank had made a breakthrough in Indonesian music in the 90's. Before Slank, Indonesian music was dominated by the so-called 'pop cengeng' and the creative pop genre. The various musical influences of Slank members made an impact on their music. This difference was found out by a graphic designer, Boedi Soesatio, who was also a family friend of Indra Q. Boedi Soesatio was the man who was the band's producer for their first three albums.

ADAT
After the three album production contract with Boedi Soesatio had been discontinued, Slank decided to produce the next album themselves. Slank tried to make another breakthrough by recording the album outside a recording studio. They used three units of ADAT, and Super VHS format recording units owned by Indra Q, the keyboardist.

Recording
The album was recorded in three places. Six songs were recorded at Pondok Nurul, a villa in Cipayung, West Java. Two songs were recorded at Bunda Emma's place in Cibubur, West Java. The rest were recorded at their home base in Jalan Potlot. The recording process was drawn as a sketch inside the album sleeve.

Chicken pox
During the recording at Pondok Nurul, Pay, the guitar player, and Indra Q, the keyboard player, caught chickenpox. They had to take a break from the recording process during the illness.

Track listing

Personnel
Slank
Bimbim – drums, backing vocals, acoustic guitar (track 5)
Bongky – bass, backing vocals, logo design
Pay – lead and rhythm guitar, backing vocals
Indra Q – keyboards, mixing, engineer, mastering
Kaka – lead vocals

Additional musicians dan production
 Slank – producer
 Piss Record – production
 Program/Virgo Record – distributed
 Pulau Biru Production – management, fans club
 Moelvallo – assistant engineer
 Teddy Riady – mic advisor
 Budi, Umar, Jeber, Jager, Mardi – crew 
 Dimas Djay – art director, design artwork & photo
 Andy "Cole" Sultan – design
 Oppie Andaresta – backing vocal on "Generasi Biru"
 Sara Wijayanto – backing vocal on "Kamu Harus Pulang"
 Njet Barmansyah – backing vocal on "Reaksi"

References

Slank albums
1994 albums